I Nyoman Adi Parwa (born 4 May 1994) is an Indonesian professional footballer who plays as a defender for Liga 2 club PSDS Deli Serdang.

Club career

Sulut United
He was signed for Sulut United to play in Liga 2 in the 2020 season. This season was suspended on 27 March 2020 due to the COVID-19 pandemic. The season was abandoned and was declared void on 20 January 2021.

Badak Lampung
In 2021, Adi Parwa signed a contract with Indonesian Liga 2 club Badak Lampung. He made his league debut on 4 October against PSKC Cimahi at the Gelora Bung Karno Madya Stadium, Jakarta.

References

External links
 
 Adi Parwa at FlashScore.co.uk
 Adi Parwa at Liga Indonesia

1994 births
Indonesian footballers
Indonesian Hindus
Sportspeople from Bali
Bali United F.C. players
Association football defenders
Living people